Meridarchis reprobata is a moth in the family Carposinidae described by Thomas Bainbrigge Fletcher in 1920. It is found in India.

References

Carposinidae